Aharon Chelouche ( / Arabic: هارون ثلاثة) (born 19 May 1840 in Oran, Algeria – 7 April 1920, British-occupied  Palestine) was an Algerian Sephardic Jew, landowner, jeweler and moneychanger. During the end of the 19th century, he was a major figure in Jaffa's Jewish community. He also known as the founder of Neve Tzedek neighborhood, now part of Tel Aviv, Israel.

Early life
Sometime in 1840 his parents travelled by ferry to Haifa. Soon afterwards the family moved to Nablus, then to Jerusalem, and thereafter finally to Jaffa. They became soon one of the leading families in the city, having exceptional good leadership skills. The Chelouche family had good connections with Arab families, as they spoke Arabic. One of the known family friends was a Turkish governor. Aharon had two sons, Avraham Haim and Yosef Eliyahu.

Adult life and career
Young Aharon started with gold and silver trade, became a money changer and started to buy land. He bought land north-east of Jaffa, where he built a house and then facilitated the creation of the neighbourhood of Neve Tzedek. Chelouche's house was one of the largest residential buildings in the late 19th century. The family started to grow and Aharon built a second floor for the house. At the east part of the house is a synagogue. Today the house is an important landmark in Neve Tzedek, but it is in a poor state of preservation and is again under construction.

The Chelouche family has also been involved in the iron and tile industry.

Aharon was interested in religious education, and hired a rabbi from Beirut to teach Torah in Jaffa.

His younger son, Yosef Eliyahu, became one of the founders of Tel Aviv.

Aharon Chelouche died 1920, an event marking the end of an era in the Chelouche family.

Photo gallery

1840 births
1920 deaths
Algerian Jews
People from Oran
Sephardi Jews in Ottoman Palestine
Aharon
Burials at Trumpeldor Cemetery